Parkinsonism is a clinical syndrome characterized by tremor, bradykinesia (slowed movements), rigidity, and postural instability. These are the four motor symptoms found in Parkinson's disease (PD), after which it is named, dementia with Lewy bodies (DLB), Parkinson's disease dementia (PDD), and many other conditions. This set of symptoms occurs in a wide range of conditions and may have many causes, including neurodegenerative conditions, drugs, toxins, metabolic diseases, and neurological conditions other than PD.

Signs and symptoms 
Parkinsonism is a clinical syndrome characterized by the four motor symptoms found in Parkinson's disease: tremor, bradykinesia (slowed movements), rigidity, and postural instability.

Parkinsonism gait problems can lead to falls and serious physical injuries. Other common symptoms include:
 Tremors when resting (mostly in the hands)
 Short, shuffling gait
 Slow movements (bradykinesia)
 Loss of sound perception leading to low, soft speech
 Difficulty sleeping
 Dry skin
 Apathy
 Lack of facial expressions
 Balance problems
 Frequent falls
 Very small handwriting
 Rigid, stiff muscles
 Cogwheeling (jerky feeling in arm or leg)

Conditions
Parkinsonism occurs in many conditions.

Neurological 
Neurodegenerative conditions and Parkinson plus syndromes that can cause parkinsonism include:
 Corticobasal degeneration
 Dementia with Lewy bodies
 The relationship (if any) with essential tremor is not clear.
 Frontotemporal dementia (Pick's disease)
 Gerstmann–Sträussler–Scheinker syndrome
 Huntington's disease
 Lytico-bodig disease (ALS complex of Guam)
 Multiple system atrophy (Shy–Drager syndrome)
 Neuroacanthocytosis
 Neuronal ceroid lipofuscinosis
 Olivopontocerebellar atrophy
 Pantothenate kinase-associated neurodegeneration, also known as neurodegeneration with brain iron accumulation
 Parkin mutation causing hereditary juvenile dystonia
 Parkinson's disease
 Parkinson's disease dementia
 Progressive supranuclear palsy
 Wilson's disease
 X-linked dystonia parkinsonism (Lubag syndrome)

Drug-induced ("pseudoparkinsonism") 
About 7% of people with parkinsonism developed symptoms as a result of side effects of medications, mainly neuroleptic antipsychotics especially the phenothiazines (such as perphenazine and chlorpromazine), thioxanthenes (such as flupenthixol and zuclopenthixol) and butyrophenones (such as haloperidol), and rarely, antidepressants. Yet another drug that can induce parkinsonism is the antihistaminic medication cinnarizine, usually prescribed for motion sickness; this is because besides antagonizing histamine receptors this drug antagonizes the dopamine D2 receptors. The incidence of drug-induced parkinsonism increases with age. Drug-induced parkinsonism tends to remain at its presenting level and does not worsen like Parkinson's disease.

Implicated medications include:
 Antipsychotics
 Lithium
 Metoclopramide
 MDMA addiction and frequent use
 Tetrabenazine
 Cinnarizine

Infectious 
 Creutzfeldt–Jakob disease
 Encephalitis lethargica
 HIV infection and AIDS

Toxins 
Evidence exists of a link between exposure to pesticides and herbicides and PD; a two-fold increase in risk was seen with paraquat or maneb/mancozeb exposure.

Chronic manganese (Mn) exposure has been shown to produce a parkinsonism-like illness characterized by movement abnormalities. This condition is not responsive to typical therapies used in the treatment of PD, suggesting an alternative pathway than the typical dopaminergic loss within the substantia nigra. Manganese may accumulate in the basal ganglia, leading to the abnormal movements. A mutation of the SLC30A10 gene, a manganese efflux transporter necessary for decreasing intracellular Mn, has been linked with the development of this parkinsonism-like disease. The Lewy bodies typical to PD are not seen in Mn-induced parkinsonism.

Agent Orange may be a cause of parkinsonism, although evidence is inconclusive and further research is needed.

Other toxins that have been associated with parkinsonism are:
 Annonaceae
 Carbon monoxide
 Carbon disulfide
 Cyanide
 Ethanol
 Hexane
 Maneb/Mancozeb
 Mercury
 Methanol
 MPTP
 Paraquat
 Rotenone
 Toluene (inhalant abuse: "huffing")

Vascular 
 Binswanger's disease (subcortical leukoencephalopathy)
 Vascular dementia (multi-infarct)

Other 
 Chronic traumatic encephalopathy (boxer's dementia or pugilistic encephalopathy)
 Damage to the brain stem (especially dopaminergic nuclei of the substantia nigra),basal ganglia (especially globus pallidus) and the thalamus.
 Hypothyroidism
 Orthostatic tremor
 Paraneoplastic syndrome: neurological symptoms caused by antibodies associated with cancers
 Rapid onset dystonia parkinsonism
 Autosomal recessive juvenile parkinsonism

Society and culture 
In the United States, the 2021 National Defense Authorization Act (NDAA) added parkinsonism to the list of presumptive conditions associated with Agent Orange exposure, enabling affected service members to receive Veterans Affairs disability benefits.

References

External links 

 GeneReviews/NIH/NCBI/UW entry on Perry syndrome
 GeneReviews/NCBI/NIH/UW entry on X-Linked Dystonia-Parkinsonism

Extrapyramidal and movement disorders
Geriatrics
Parkinson's disease